Emil Tchakarov, born 29 June 1948 in Burgas, Bulgaria; died 4 August 1991 in Paris, was a Bulgarian conductor who had a career both in the concert hall and in the opera house. He also made a series of Russian opera recordings.

Life and career
Tchakarov began violin lessons at the age of six, entering the Sofia High School of Music in 1962 (violin). From 1967 to 1971 he was a student at the Sofia State Conservatoire where he also conducted the orchestra. In 1971 he won third prize in the 2nd International Herbert von Karajan Conducting Competition in Berlin, acting as Karajan's assistant in Berlin and Salzburg and continuing his conducting studies in Hilversum and Tanglewood. 
From 1974 to 1978 he was Chief Conductor of the Plovdiv Philharmonic Orchestra. 
In 1979 he made his debut at the Metropolitan Opera in New York, and other American cities with Eugene Onegin (1979-1980), returning for Il Barbiere di Siviglia (1982–83) and Boris Godunov (1990).
Following this he guest conducted many orchestras around the world including the Leningrad Philharmonic, with whom he made several recordings and became guest conductor in the 1989/90 season.

Among operatic engagements for Covent Garden he conducted Eugene Onegin in 1979, while in Nice in November 1985 he conducted Simon Boccanegra with Wilhelmenia Fernandez and Piero Cappuccilli, returning in January 1987 for Tosca with Olivia Stapp, Nicolai Gedda and Theo Adam, and in Houston in October 1986 he conducted Boris Godunov with Nicolai Ghiaurov in the title role,.  He stepped in to replace Giuseppe Sinopoli to open Houston Grand Opera's first season in the Wortham Center in October 1987, conducting Verdi's Aida, starring Mirella Freni, Plácido Domingo and Ghiaurov. In 1983 he conducted Tannhäuser at the Florence Festival.
 
Between 1983 and 1986 he was the Chief Conductor of the Royal Flemish Philharmonic in Antwerp. He conducted the premiere of Michel Decoust's 'Hommage a Maurice Ravel' at the Festival de Radio-France et de Montpellier in July 1987.

In 1986 Tchakarov founded the Sofia Festival Orchestra with the support of prominent Bulgarian musicians. He conducted the Verdi Requiem at the Lucerne Festival in 1989 and in Sofia. At the end of the 1980s his international renown led CBS Records, Sony to engage him to record a series of six Russian Operas, which he did over four years with the Sofia Festival Orchestra.

Tchakarov was the conductor for the Maurice Béjart 1981 TV film Six personnages en quête d'un chanteur starring Ruggero Raimondi.

He gave his last concert on 22 March 1991 with the French National Orchestra in Paris.

The concert hall and summer classical music festival in Burgas bears his name.

Selected discography  
 Ludwig van Beethoven: Violin Concerto in C WoO.5 : fragment; Romance No.1 in G Op.40 (Gidon Kremer, violin) London Symphony Orchestra. Deutsche Grammophon, recorded 1978.
 Alexander Borodin: Prince Igor with Boris Martinovich, Stefka Evstatieva, Kaludi Kaludov, Nicola Ghiuselev, Nicolai Ghiaurov, Alexandrina Milcheva, Sofia Festival Orchestra. Grand Prix du Disque 1989.
 Anton Bruckner. Symphony No 4. Leningrad Philharmonic Orchestra, Melodiya recorded 1978 (Melodiya 2LP C10 09477-80)
 Mikhail Glinka: A Life for the Tsar with Boris Martinovich, Chris Merritt, Stefania Toczyska, Alexandrina Pendachanska, Sofia Festival Orchestra.
 Felix Mendelssohn: Violin concerto (with Augustin Dumay). London Symphony Orchestra. EMI France, recorded 1988.
 Modest Mussorgsky: Boris Godunov with Nicolai Ghiaurov, Michail Svetlev, Josef Frank, Stefka Mineva, Nicola Ghiuselev, Sofia Festival Orchestra. Recorded 1986.
 Modest Mussorgsky: Khovanshchina with Nicolai Ghiaurov, Alexandrina Milcheva, Zdravko Gadjev, Nicola Ghiuselev, Kaludi Kaludov, Sofia Festival Orchestra. Recorded 1986.
 Franz Schubert: Concertstück in D D345; Rondo in A D438; Polonaise in B flat D580 (Gidon Kremer, violin) London Symphony Orchestra. Deutsche Grammophon, recorded 1978.
 Richard Strauss : Also sprach Zarathustra. Orchestra Simfonică A Radioteleviziunii Române. Live recording from the 1981 George Enescu festival in Bucharest. Electrecord – F.E. 81-012 
 Pyotr Ilyich Tchaikovsky: The Queen of Spades with Wieslaw Ochman, Stefka Evstatieva, Penka Dilova, Ivan Konsulov, Yuri Mazurok, Sofia Festival Orchestra. Recorded 1988, Sony.
 Pyotr Ilyich Tchaikovsky: Eugene Onegin with Yuri Mazurok, Anna Tomowa-Sintow, Nicolai Gedda, Rossitsa Troeva-Mircheva, Sofia Festival Orchestra. Sony 1988
 Pyotr Ilyich Tchaikovsky: Violin concerto (with Augustin Dumay). London Symphony Orchestra. EMI France, recorded 1988.
 'Treasures of the Baroque Era'. ('Albinoni Adagio' (Giazotto); Bach: Brandenburg Concerto No.3; Boccherini: Night Music in Madrid; Handel: Concerto Grosso op. 6, no. 12; Rameau: Concerto No.6; Torelli: Christmas Concerto; Marcello: Introduction, aria & presto; Vivaldi: Concerto Grosso op. 3, no. 8) - National Iranian Radio & Television Chamber Orchestra. EMI ASD 3613 & 3614 (SLS 5144) recorded 1978, Tehran.

References

1948 births
1991 deaths
Musicians from Burgas
20th-century classical musicians
Bulgarian conductors (music)
20th-century conductors (music)